St Ives Bridge is a 15th-century bridge crossing the River Great Ouse in St Ives, Cambridgeshire, England. It is noted for being one of only four bridges in England to incorporate a chapel (the others being at Rotherham, Wakefield, and Bradford-on-Avon).

History
Prior to the first bridge here there was a ford across the Ouse, probably dating back several thousand years. The river was at that time wider and shallower until locks were added to make it navigable.

The St Ives settlement was developed by the monks of Ramsey Abbey who built the town's first bridge, a wooden structure, in 1107. In 1414 it was decided to replace this bridge with a stone arch bridge, which was completed in 1425, adding the bridge chapel dedicated to St Leger in 1426.

Such chapels were relatively common in medieval times and served as toll-houses, as well as to allow travellers to pray or to give thanks for a safe journey. They also hosted church services.

During the English Civil War the bridge was partially blown up by the troops of Oliver Cromwell to prevent King Charles I's troops approaching London from the Royalist base in Lincolnshire. The two arches on the southern side were demolished and a drawbridge installed in 1645 as a defensive measure by Cromwell's forces, who held the town. The drawbridge remained in use until 1716. When the bridge was partially rebuilt that year, the shape of the new arches was different from the surviving ones, leaving the bridge with two rounded arches on its South side and two Gothic arches on the North.

At some point, the bridge chapel fell into disuse and was for a time  used as a bawdy house during the eighteenth century. St Ives was an official last stop of all the many drovers with their livestock, who descended upon St Ives  for accommodation, refreshments and other relief, during what was a tiring journey to Smithfield market within London. At one time there were dozens of doss houses, inns and other bawdy houses, in and around St Ives town centre.

The chapel was restored in 1930, having previously served as a toll house, inn and as a private residence. It had  been designed as a chapel, though, and dedicated by the monks to Saint Leger. By 1736 it was being used as accommodation, and in that year two extra floors were added. During the 1850s and 1860s it was turned into a notorious public house named "Little Hell", then a doctor's surgery. By 1930 the structure was found to be weakened so the extra stories were removed and the chapel restored. As a result, the roof is modern. An unusual feature is the crypt, about two metres above the river's water level. The bridge and the chapel are now Grade I listed and a Scheduled Ancient Monument. The chapel is still used for public worship on an occasional basis.

The bridge served as the primary southern entrance to the town and the only road bridge across the river until Harrison Way by-pass was added down-river to the east in 1980.

Preservation
The bridge is one of nine Scheduled Ancient Monument Grade 1 in Cambridgeshire. All maintenance must be carried out in a sympathetic manner to preserve its aesthetic and functional aspects. Since 1980 the foundations have been strengthened and the structure reinforced. In 1998 the bridge was resurfaced, special precautions being taken to prevent water ingress into the structure. In 2002, external lighting of the arches and chapel was fitted, along with internal lighting of the chapel and lights fitted into the pedestrian refuges at each pier. English Heritage control all work on the bridge, although it is not one of the properties in Cambridgeshire that they own.

Recent events

1976

A gravel lorry breached the parapet. St Ives sub-aqua club recovered the stones from the river-bed. George Hunter from Huntington was one of the local tradesman assigned to restore the chapel after this event. All tradesmen who worked on the project have details engraved on the stones that rebuilt the bridge chapel.

1947

During the big flood this year an amphibious tank breached the parapet.

1941
A Home Guard Bren gun carrier breached the parapet.

See also
 Old Bridge, Huntingdon, 6 miles up-stream.
 Chantry Chapel of St Mary the Virgin, Wakefield
 Rotherham Bridge
 St Mary's Bridge Chapel (Derby)

Notes

External links

 Photographs exploring the Chapel, and showing the previous extra floors.
 Night picture of the bridge and Chapel, newly floodlighted in 2002/3.
 Panoramic view from the bridge
 Information provided by British Waterways
 Bridge maintenance policy

Bridges across the River Great Ouse
Bridges in Cambridgeshire
Buildings and structures completed in 1107
Bridges completed in 1425
Deck arch bridges
Grade I listed bridges
Grade I listed buildings in Cambridgeshire
Scheduled monuments in Cambridgeshire
Stone bridges in the United Kingdom
Buildings and structures in Huntingdonshire
Arch bridges in England
Bridges completed in the 12th century
Former toll bridges in England
Bridges with buildings
Bridge